Motorcycles produced under the Triumph brand, by both the original company, Triumph Engineering Co Ltd, and its later incarnations, and the current Triumph Motorcycles Ltd.

Triumph Engineering Co Ltd
Known as the Meriden, West Midlands, UK era, 1902–1983.

Pre-war

Post-war

Triples
For full detail see BSA Rocket 3/Triumph Trident (for corresponding BSA models see BSA Triples)

From 1985 to 1988
Triumph Bonneville

Triumph Motorcycles Limited 
Known as the Hinckley, Leicestershire era, 1990–.

|Triumph Tiger Sport 660
|660
|2022 on
|660 cc 80 bhp tricylinder evolved from Tiger 1200 . Adapted to Euro5
|-
|}

References

 

Triumph
Triumph

fr:Triumph (moto)
it:Triumph
nl:Triumph (motorfiets)
ja:トライアンフ (二輪車)
sv:Triumph (mc)